Mattis Leonid Rakov Alexevitch Mathiesen (30 June 1924 – 9 October 2010) was a Norwegian photographer and film director.

He hailed from Ålesund. His grandfather was a Russian immigrant. Mathiesen stayed in the United Kingdom during the Second World War, where he learned photography.

He worked in the company Teamfilm. He did the photography for, among others, Elskere (1963) and Vildanden (1963, TV 1989). In 1970 he won the Aamot-statuetten. He was also the photographer for the Olsenbanden films. He was the producer of Viva Villaveien! (1989) and distributor of Fredrikssons fabrikk (1994).

He lived in Bærum, and died in October 2010.

External links

References

1924 births
2010 deaths
Norwegian photographers
Norwegian film producers
Norwegian people of Russian descent
Norwegian expatriates in the United Kingdom
People from Ålesund
People from Bærum